Swiss Miss is a 1938 comedy film starring Laurel and Hardy. It was directed by John G. Blystone, and produced by Hal Roach. The film features Walter Woolf King, Della Lind and Eric Blore.

Plot
Stan and Ollie are mousetrap salesmen hoping for better business in Switzerland, with Stan's theory that because there is more cheese in Switzerland, there should be more mice.

While visiting one village, they find the villagers unresponsive. On top of that, a cheese shop owner (Charles Judels) cons them out of their wares with a bogus banknote. Despite having no money, they order a meal at a nearby hotel, and are forced to work as dishwasher when they can't pay. They antagonize and insult the chef (Adia Kuznetzoff), who tells them that for each dish they break they must work another day.

Meanwhile Victor Albert (Walter Woolf King), a composer – along with his assistant, Edward (Eric Blore) – is residing in the hotel to work on his next opera, which he intends to have staged without his opera star wife, Anna (Della Lind), who gets better reviews – and more notice – than his music does. Anna comes to see him but he tells her to go away. Pouting in the lobby, she meets Stan and Ollie, who tell her how they came to work there. Anna decides to use the same method to get a job as a chambermaid and stay close to her husband, in order to convince him to let her star in his new opera.

Stan gets drunk on a St. Bernard's keg of brandy, so that when he and Ollie are told to move the composer's piano to a treehouse where he can work in peace, Stan is not much help, especially when they have to cross a narrow rope bridge over a deep ravine to get there. While they are crossing, they have a confrontation with a local street musician's gorilla. The struggle ends with the bridge breaking and the piano and the gorilla plunging into the abyss.

The smashing of the piano obliges the composer to use the large organ in the hotel lobby until a replacement piano is delivered. Assigned to wash the stairs, the boys inadvertently dump soap water into the organ pipes and this causes the music to be accompanied by bubbles as the composer works.

While talking with Anna, and not knowing who she actually is, Ollie falls in love with her, and he and Stan go to serenade her. Before they can start she comes to the window, and Ollie invites her to the next day's Alpen Fest. She tells them she has a special plan for the Fest and will see them the next day. Realizing that they never serenaded her, Ollie sings "Let Me Call You Sweetheart" accompanied by Stan playing a tuba. This wakes up the chef, who lives upstairs. He is also in love with Anna, and warns Ollie that she is his girl. He douses Ollie with a pitcher of water and then threatens the boys with dire consequences if they go to the Fest.

The next day, Anna, Ollie and Stan go to the festival dressed as gypsies, and Anna sings, knowing that Victor, her composer husband, will be listening. Victor recognizes her and tells his assistant to bring her to his room. Stan and Ollie wait for her outside, but the chef appears and a wild chase ensues. The boys overpower the chef and then force their way into Victor's room, only to discover that Anna is the wife of the composer.

As they leave the hotel and village, they are confronted by the vengeful gorilla, bandaged and on crutches, who hurls his crutch at them before they depart, running.

Cast 

Cast notes:
 Della Lind made her American film debut in Swiss Miss. She was under contract to M-G-M, and was borrowed for the film. Lind was given the choice of either Walter Woolf King or Ray Middleton to play opposite, and picked King.
 Charles Gemora, who plays the gorilla, had six years earlier appeared in the title role of a Laurel and Hardy theatrical short The Chimp.
 Franz Hug demonstrated the art of flag throwing during the opening ceremonies of the 1936 Summer Olympic Games, held in Berlin, Germany.

Production 
The working title for Swiss Miss was "Swiss Cheese". Production dates for the film were from December 28, 1937 to February 26, 1938, with additional scenes shot on April 1 and 21. Location shooting took place at Lake Arrowhead and Stone Canyon, both in California.

Producer Hal Roach had originally intended that the film be shot in color, but changed his mind because of the cost of doing so. Roach is said to have interfered during the film's editing, much to Stan Laurel's exasperation. Always a large creative force behind the camera, Laurel objected to Roach's removing scenes, including the addition of a bomb in the composer's piano, where the tapping of a particular key would set it off. A drunken Stan is seen touching the piano keys during the piano delivery sequence involving the gorilla; Laurel initially thought the inclusion of the bomb would give the scene more power. A musical number in the cheese shop was also removed; only a few lyrics remain in the film. Roach also filled-in when director John G. Blystone was ill, although little of the footage he shot ended up in the final film.

The additional scenes which were shot in April were directed by Sidney Van Keuren, the film's associate producer.

Songs
The songs "The Cricket Song," "Yo-Ho-Dee-O-Lay-Hee," "I Can't Get Over the Alps" and "Gypsy Song" were written by Phil Charig (music) and Arthur Quenzer (lyrics). "Let Me Call You Sweetheart", which Ollie sings to serenade his sweetheart, accompanied by Stan on the tuba, was written by Beth Slater Whitson and Leo Friedman (music and lyrics).

References
Notes

Bibliography
 Everson, William K. (2000) [1967] The Complete Films of Laurel and Hardy. New York: Citadel. .
 Louvish, Simon. Stan and Ollie: The Roots of Comedy. London: Faber & Faber, 2001. .
 McCabe, John (2004) Babe: The Life of Oliver Hardy. London:Robson Books Ltd. .
 McCabe, John with Kilgore, Al and Bann, Richard W. (1983) [1975] Laurel & Hardy. New York:Bonanza Books. .
 McGarry, Annie (1992) Laurel & Hardy. London: Bison Group. .

External links 

 
 
 
 
 

1938 films
1938 comedy films
American black-and-white films
Films directed by John G. Blystone
Laurel and Hardy (film series)
Metro-Goldwyn-Mayer films
Films with screenplays by Felix Adler (screenwriter)
1930s English-language films
1930s American films